Satellite Spies was a New Zealand band formed in 1984 by Deane Sutherland and Mark Loveys. The group enjoyed some success with "Destiny in Motion" (1985) which charted at #14, and in the 1985 New Zealand Music Awards were voted Most Promising Group, with Loveys awarded Most Promising Male Vocalist. They supported Dire Straits during their 1986 tour of New Zealand.

Since a split in 1987, rights to the name have been disputed and at times there have been two bands calling themselves Satellite Spies. One of these, led by Deane Sutherland, had a 1994 hit with "It Must Be Love", which reached #9 in the New Zealand Top 40.

Members 
Graeme Scott was the drummer from 1991 to 1997, and from 2000 to 2001. During the late 1970s, he was a member of Gary Havoc & The Hurricanes.

Discography

Albums

Singles

References

External links 

 Satellite Spies – Mark Loveys website
 Satellite Spies – Deane Sutherland website
 Satellite Spies 1980s music videos

New Zealand musical groups